Accomplished Quaker was a French vessel that the British captured circa 1795. She first appeared in Lloyd's Register (LR) in the volume for 1795.

Captain Musgrave Walker acquired a letter of marque on 22 August 1795. He sailed from Liverpool on 19 September 1795. A French privateer captured Accomplished Quaker and took her into Gorée before she could gather any slaves.

Accomplished Quaker did not appear on the lists of vessels cleared out of English ports bound for Africa.

In 1796, 22 British slave ships were lost. Three of these were lost on their way to Africa. War, not maritime hazards nor slave resistance, was the greatest cause of vessel losses among British slave vessels.

Citations

References
 

Ships built in France
1780s ships
Captured ships
Liverpool slave ships